William Rand Kenan Jr. (April 30, 1872 – July 28, 1965) was an American chemist, engineer, manufacturer, dairy farmer, and philanthropist.

Early life
William Rand Kenan Jr. was born in Wilmington, North Carolina, on April 30, 1872., son of William Rand Kenan (1845-1903) and Mary Hargrave. His father, who became a trustee of the University of North Carolina, was a Civil War veteran, customs collector, white supremacist, life insurance agent, and wholesale merchant. He was a brother of Sarah Graham Kenan and a grandson of Owen Rand Kenan. Kenan graduated from the University of North Carolina at Chapel Hill in 1894 and was a member of Sigma Alpha Epsilon.

Career
He started his career by establishing plants for acetylene production in the United States, Australia, and Germany. In 1896, he worked for Union Carbide (now a subsidiary of Dow Chemical Company) in Niagara Falls, New York.

Between 1899 and 1900, he helped develop Florida's east coast with oilman Henry Flagler. This included the construction of the Florida East Coast Railway and the Florida East Coast Hotel Company, including the Breakers Hotel in Palm Beach, Florida.

In 1901, Flagler married Kenan's sister, Mary Lily Kenan. In 1904, William Kenan married Alice Pomroy, whom he had met at Flagler's home. After Flagler's death in 1913, Mary Lily and Flagler's surviving two sisters inherited his estate. In 1917, Mary Lily died and Kenan inherited most of Flagler's estate.

He moved to Lockport, New York, his wife Alice's hometown, and ran the Western Block Company, the largest maker of block and tackle in the United States. He maintained Randleigh Farm, a model dairy farm for research with Jersey cattle. He spent the rest of his life writing and donating resources to philanthropic endeavors.

In 1944, Kenan was awarded an honorary Doctor of Laws degree by the University of North Carolina.

Death and legacy
Kenan died in 1965. In 1986, the Kenan Center was founded at the University of North Carolina at Chapel Hill. It houses the Kenan Institute for the Study of Private Enterprise as well as the William R. Kenan Jr. Charitable Trust and William R. Kenan Jr. Fund. Moreover, he provided the funds for Kenan Memorial Stadium and it was named, at his request, in honor of his parents. When it was revealed that his father participated in the murder of innocent African Americans during the Wilmington Massacre Wilmington insurrection of 1898, the stadium was rededicated to William Kenan Jr. ("William Sr. was the commander of a white supremacist paramilitary force, which massacred scores of black residents in Wilmington, on a single day in 1898.")  The Kenan–Flagler Business School at UNC is named for him and his sister, Mary Kenan Flagler. The Kenan Institute for Ethics at Duke University was founded in 1995. Eighty-five endowed professorships at colleges and universities in the United States are named for him.

Another Kenan Center is located in Lockport, New York. The Lockport area also benefited significantly from Kenan's philanthropy.

Writings

References

External links
  (1935–1956)

1872 births
1965 deaths
People from Wilmington, North Carolina
Businesspeople from Florida
People from Lockport, New York
University of North Carolina at Chapel Hill alumni
American chemists
Farmers from New York (state)
Philanthropists from New York (state)
Scientists from New York (state)
William